Leonardo De Mitri (1914–1956) was an Italian film director and screenwriter.

Selected filmography
 The Outlaws (1950)
 Cats and Dogs (1952)
 The Angel of Sin (1952)
 Verginità (1952)
 Martin Toccaferro (1953)
 Altair (1956)
 Wives and Obscurities (1956)

References

Bibliography
 Goble, Alan. The Complete Index to Literary Sources in Film. Walter de Gruyter, 1999.

External links

1914 births
1956 deaths
Italian male film actors
20th-century Italian screenwriters
Italian film directors
Italian male screenwriters
20th-century Italian male writers